Alberto Moreno (born 1992) is a Spanish footballer.

Alberto Moreno may also refer to:

 Jorge Alberto Negrete Moreno (1911–1953), Mexican singer and actor
 Alberto Moreno (politician) (born 1941), Peruvian politician
 Alberto Moreno (diver) (born 1950), Cuban diver
 Luis Alberto Moreno (born 1953), Colombian businessman and politician
 Julio Alberto Moreno Casas (born 1958), Spanish footballer
 Tito (footballer, born May 1985), full name Alberto Ortiz Moreno, Spanish footballer
 Carlos Sánchez (Colombian footballer), (born 1986; full name Carlos Alberto Sánchez Moreno), Colombian footballer
 Jesús Alberto Moreno Salas (born 1990), Mexican footballer
 Junior Alberto Moreno (born 2000), Venezuelan footballer
 Alberto Moreno, member of rock group Museo Rosenbach